The Albania national under-19 football team represents Albania in international football at this age level in the UEFA European Under-19 Football Championship and the FIFA U-20 World Cup, as well as any other under-19 international football tournaments. It is controlled by Albanian Football Association, the governing body for football in Albania.

Competitive record
Before 2002, the event was classified as a U-18 tournament.

Recent results

Players

Current squad
 The following players were called up for friendly matches matches against Malta on 23 and 26 March 2023.Caps and goals correct as of:' 24 September 2022, after the match against Players in bold have been called up or have played at least one full international match with national senior team.''

Recent call-ups
Following are listed players called up in the previous 12 months that are still eligible to represent Under 19 team.

Notes
U17 = Was called up from national under-17 squad.
U21 = Was called up from national under-21 squad.

Coaching staff
Current coaching staff:

See also
 Albania men's national football team
 Albania men's national under-23 football team
 Albania men's national under-21 football team
 Albania men's national under-20 football team
 Albania men's national under-18 football team
 Albania men's national under-17 football team
 Albania men's national under-16 football team
 Albania men's national under-15 football team
 Albania women's national football team
 Albania women's national under-19 football team
 Albania women's national under-17 football team
 Albania national football team results
 Albania national youth football team
 Albanian Superliga
 Football in Albania
 List of Albania international footballers

References

External links
 Albania under-19 football team at UEFA.com
 Albania under-19 at Soccerway

European national under-19 association football teams
under-19
Football in Albania